Wrestle Kingdom 16 was a three-day professional wrestling pay-per-view (PPV) event co-produced by the New Japan Pro-Wrestling (NJPW) and Pro Wrestling Noah (Noah) promotions. The event took place on January 4 and 5, 2022, at the Tokyo Dome, in Tokyo and January 8, at Yokohama Arena in Yokohama, Japan. It was the 31st January 4 Tokyo Dome Show and the 16th promoted under the Wrestle Kingdom name; it was also the first time the event was held over three days and the first one to take place in Yokohama. It marked the first January 4 Tokyo Dome Show since 2007's Wrestle Kingdom I to be co-produced with another wrestling promotion.

Days 1 and 2 of the event aired on the NJPW World streaming service and via FITE TV and other PPV providers; Day 3 aired as a PPV event on AbemaTV before being archived on NJPW World and Wrestle Universe.

Production

Background
The January 4 Tokyo Dome Show is NJPW's biggest annual event and has been called "the largest professional wrestling show in the world outside of the United States" and the "Japanese equivalent to the Super Bowl". The show has been promoted under the Wrestle Kingdom name since 2007.

Wrestle Kingdom 16 was officially announced on September 4, 2021. It will be the first January 4 Tokyo Dome Show to be held over three days, with the third day being similar to the traditional New Year Dash!! event. The third day of the event will be held at the Yokohama Arena, marking the first time one of NJPW's January 4 shows was held outside of Tokyo. On November 20, it was announced that the third day of the event would be co-produced by the Noah promotion.

Like the previous two years, NJPW's sister promotion World Wonder Ring Stardom will have a match on January 5. The last two Stardom matches at Wrestle Kingdom were dark matches due to two promotions being on different broadcasting networks with TV Asahi and Samurai TV; but at Wrestle Grand Slam in MetLife Dome, Stardom was featured on the pre-show on both days which were broadcast live on NJPW World. On December 12, a member of each Stardom faction draw straws to determinate who would be in the match at day 2 of Wrestle Kingdom 16, which Mayu Iwatani and Starlight Kid were chosen to face Tam Nakano and Saya Kamitani in a tag team match. NJPW has announced that the match will be included on the main card.

Storylines
Wrestle Kingdom 16 featured professional wrestling matches that involved different wrestlers from pre-existing scripted feuds and storylines. Wrestlers portrayed villains, heroes, or less distinguishable characters in the scripted events that built tension and culminated in a wrestling match or series of matches.

After defending the IWGP World Heavyweight Championship against Shingo Takagi at Wrestling Dontaku, Will Ospreay was forced to relinquish the title after suffering a serious neck injury. At Dominion 6.6 in Osaka-jo Hall, Takagi defeated Kazuchika Okada to win the vacant title. Okada would later win the G1 Glimax for a third time, earning himself another opportunity against Takagi and the title at Wrestle Kingdom. Okada requested to be given the retired IWGP Heavyweight Championship belt to represent the certificate instead of a briefcase which the winners of the G1 usually received, which was granted and Okada successfully defended the certificate against Tama Tonga at Power Struggle while Takagi retained the championship in the main event against Zack Sabre Jr. Meanwhile, Ospreay made a recovery and appeared at Resurgence with a replica of the IWGP World Heavyweight Championship belt where he called himself the "real" champion and also called Takagi an interim champion. At Battle in the Valley, Opsreay called out both Takagi and Okada and challenged for the title at Wrestle Kingdom, and it was announced that he would face the winner of their match, set to take place on night 1, on night 2 of Wrestle Kingdom for the title.

On November 6, 2021, at Power Struggle, Kenta defeated IWGP United States Heavyweight champion Hiroshi Tanahashi to the win the title for the first time. After losing the title, Tanahashi requested a rematch for the belt at Wrestle Kingdom but Kenta declined, not wanting to give the ace a 'direct rematch'. In order to persuade Kenta to accept, Tanahashi offered to let Kenta pick the stipulation, hoping the sweeten the deal. On the final night of Best of Super Juniors/World Tag League Kenta appeared via video to finally accept Tanahashi's request, but only if Tanahashi agreed to a No Disqualification, Anything Goes match at Wrestle Kingdom. Tanahashi accepted and the match was signed for Night 2.

On April 9, 2017, Katsuyori Shibata suffered a subdural hematoma during his match with Okada at Sakura Genesis which he was forced to retire from in-ring competition shortly after. During his hiatus, Shibata became the head trainer at NJPW's LA Dojo in Los Angeles where he trains recruits for the promotion. At the G1 Climax 31 finals on October 21, 2021, Shibata had an unannounced 5-minute UWF Rules exhibition match with Zack Sabre Jr. which ended in a time limit draw. After the match, Shibata said he planned to return to the in-ring competition soon. At the Best of the Super Jrs. and World Tag League finals on December 15, he announced that he would make his official in-ring return on day 1 of Wrestle Kingdom 16. Shibata's opponent was not announced prior to the event. It was also announced that Shibata would participate in a catch wrestling rules match, but just before the scheduled bout, Shibata forwent the catch rules, opting to wrestle a normal singles match.

Results

See also

2022 in professional wrestling
List of NJPW pay-per-view events
Professional wrestling at the Tokyo Dome

References

External links
Official website

2022 in Tokyo
2022 in professional wrestling
January 2022 events in Japan
January 4 Tokyo Dome Show
Events in Tokyo
Events in Yokohama
Professional wrestling in Yokohama
Professional wrestling joint events
Pro Wrestling Noah shows